Roselle is a frazione or village in the comune of Grosseto. The archaeological remains of the ancient city of Rusellae are located to the northeast of the modern settlement.

References

Bibliography

See also 

 List of Catholic dioceses in Italy
 Alberese
 Batignano
 Braccagni
 Istia d'Ombrone
 Marina di Grosseto
 Montepescali
 Principina a Mare
 Principina Terra
 Rispescia

External links 

 GCatholic - historical and titular bishopric of Roselle
 Rusellae at LacusCurtius

Roman towns and cities in Italy
Former Roman Catholic dioceses in Italy
Frazioni of Grosseto